Mohammad Alamgir Kabir (born January 10, 1981 in Dhaka) is a Bangladeshi cricketer who played in three tests from 2002 to 2004. He is the only Bangladeshi test cricketer to have made a pair on test debut.

References

1981 births
Living people
Bangladesh Test cricketers
Bangladeshi cricketers
Rajshahi Division cricketers
Abahani Limited cricketers
People from Chapai Nawabganj district